Manuel Tato (March 5, 1907 – August 12, 1980) was a prelate of the Roman Catholic Church. He served as auxiliary bishop of Buenos Aires from 1948 till 1961, when he became bishop of Santiago del Estero.

Life 
Born in Buenos Aires, Tato was ordained to the priesthood on December 21, 1929.

On November 12, 1948, he was appointed auxiliary bishop of Buenos Aires and titular bishop of Aulon. Tato received his episcopal consecration on March 27, 1949 from Santiago Luis Cardinal Copello, archbishop of Buenos Aires, with the archbishop of Santa Fe, Nicolás Fasolino, who would later become a cardinal, and the auxiliary bishop of Buenos Aires, Antonio Rocca, serving as co-consecrators.

On July 11, 1961, he was appointed bishop of Santiago del Estero, where he was installed on the following December 8.

As a bishop he was principal consecrator of Antonio María Aguirre, bishop of San Isidro, and Juan José Iriarte, archbishop of Rosario.

He died on August 12, 1980.

References

External links 
 Entry about Manuel Tato at catholic-hierarchy.org 

1907 births
1980 deaths
20th-century Roman Catholic bishops in Argentina
Roman Catholic bishops of Santiago del Estero